Oshtorjin (also Romanized as Oshtorjīn; also known as Ostorjīn) is a village in Seyyed Jamal ol Din Rural District, in the Central District of Asadabad County, Hamadan Province, Iran. At the 2006 census, its population was 531, in 110 families.

References 

Populated places in Asadabad County